Drielly Neves Daltoe (born ) is a Brazilian group rhythmic gymnast. She represents her nation at international competitions. She competed at world championships, including at the 2011  World Rhythmic Gymnastics Championships.

References

1993 births
Living people
Brazilian rhythmic gymnasts
Place of birth missing (living people)
Gymnasts at the 2011 Pan American Games
Pan American Games medalists in gymnastics
Pan American Games gold medalists for Brazil
South American Games gold medalists for Brazil
South American Games medalists in gymnastics
Competitors at the 2010 South American Games
Medalists at the 2011 Pan American Games
21st-century Brazilian women